Check or cheque, may refer to:

Places
 Check, Virginia

Arts, entertainment, and media
 Check (film), a 2021 Indian Telugu-language film
 The Checks (episode), a 1996 TV episode of Seinfeld

Games and sports
 Check (chess), a threat to capture the king or general
 Check (poker), declining to bet
 Checking (ice hockey), several techniques
 Cross-check, in chess, a check played in reply to a check
 Poker chip, less commonly referred to as a check

Music
 "Check" (Meek Mill song), 2015
 "Check" (Young Thug song), 2015
 "Check", a song by Chris Janson from the album Real Friends
 "Check", a song by E-40 from the album The D-Boy Diary: Book 1
 "Check", a song by Kojo Funds
 "Check", a song by Lil Durk from the album Lil Durk 2X
 "Check", a song by Max Webster from the album Universal Juveniles
 "Check", a song by Nas and Rick Ross from the soundtrack to Creed II
 "Check", a song by Quin NFN
 "Check", a song by Qveen Herby from the 2020 EP 8
 "Check", a song by Rustic Overtones from the album Rooms by the Hour
 "Check", a song by U.S.D.A. from the album Cold Summer
 "Check", a song by Zebrahead from the album Waste of Mind
 "Check (Let's Ride)", a song by Lil' Flip from the album U Gotta Feel Me
 The Checks (band), a New Zealand band

Computing
 Check (mobile app), a mobile banking application
 CHECK Scheme, a penetration testing certification run by CESG
 Checkbox, a type of widget in computing

Patterns
 Check (pattern) (or "Chequered"), a pattern of squares such as that used on chess boards, fabrics
 Tartan, a checked pattern in fabric and weaving

Other uses
 Check mark, a symbol used to indicate completion, verification, or selection
 Checked baggage, luggage or parcels placed by an airline or train for transportation in the hold or baggage car
 Cheque ("Check" in U.S. English), an order for transfer of money
 Rain check, an idiom from baseball meaning a deferral
 Check, a receipt presented to a diner at the end of a meal

See also

 Checklist
 Check sheet
 Checker (disambiguation)
 Checkers (disambiguation)
 Checkmate (disambiguation)
 Chek (disambiguation)
 Czech (disambiguation)
 
 
 
 
 Test (disambiguation)